Darang Madu (also Romanized as Darang Madū; also known as Darang Madūnag) is a village in Gafr and Parmon Rural District, Gafr and Parmon District, Bashagard County, Hormozgan Province, Iran. At the 2006 census, its population was 234, in 42 families.

References 

Populated places in Bashagard County